The Cité florale (English: floral city} is a residential area located in the 13th arrondissement of Paris, France.  It forms a triangular area with individual houses.  Each of the houses within the neighbourhood has its own flower garden, the streets are paved and are named after flowers.

The appearance of this area is unusual because it is surrounded by buildings much more modern.

References

13th arrondissement of Paris